The Legend of Qin,  Qin's Moon, may refer to:

 The Legend of Qin (novel series), a novel series by Taiwanese writer and entrepreneur Sayling Wen (Wen Shiren)
 The Legend of Qin (TV series), the CG Chinese animated TV series directed by Robin Shen (Shen Leping), produced by Sparkly Key Animation Studio
 The Legend of Qin (film), a 2014 CG Chinese animated film directed by Robin Shen (Shen Leping), produced by Sparkly Key Animation Studio
 The Legend of Qin (live action TV series), the live action TV series produced by Tangren Media